"Mi Amor" is a song by French singer Souf. It was released as the debut single from his debut album Alchimie. The music video has over 210 million views.

Charts

References

2016 songs
2016 singles
French-language songs